The Claysville "S" Bridge is a historic S bridge in Washington County, Pennsylvania.  The bridge is made of stone and was a part of the Cumberland Road (later National Road) and helped transport wagons and stagecoaches amid the American westward expansion in the early 19th century.  It passes over Buffalo Creek.

In 1947, the Pennsylvania Historical and Museum Commission installed a historical marker noting the historic importance of the bridge.  It is designated as a historic bridge by the Washington County History & Landmarks Foundation.

References

External links
[ National Register nomination form]

Road bridges on the National Register of Historic Places in Pennsylvania
Bridges completed in 1818
Bridges in Washington County, Pennsylvania
National Register of Historic Places in Washington County, Pennsylvania
Stone bridges in the United States